Chef is a 2014 American road comedy-drama film directed, written, co-produced by, and starring  Jon Favreau as a chef who, after a public altercation with a food critic, loses his job at a popular Los Angeles restaurant and begins to operate a food truck with his young son. It co-stars Sofía Vergara, John Leguizamo, Scarlett Johansson, Oliver Platt, Bobby Cannavale, and Dustin Hoffman, along with Robert Downey Jr. in a cameo role.

Favreau wrote the script after directing several big-budget films, wanting to go "back to basics" and to create a film about cooking. Food truck owner and chef Roy Choi served as a co-producer and oversaw the menus and food prepared for the film. Principal photography took place in July 2013 in Los Angeles, Miami, Austin and New Orleans.

Chef premiered at South by Southwest on March 7, 2014, and was released theatrically on May 9, 2014, by Open Road Films. It was well received by critics, who praised the direction, music, writing, story, and performances, and grossed $46 million against a production budget of $11 million.

Plot
Miami-born Carl Casper is the head chef of Gauloises in Brentwood, Los Angeles. While popular with his kitchen staff and hostess Molly, Carl clashes with the restaurant's owner, Riva, who wants him to stick to classical cuisine rather than innovative dishes. Carl also has a strained relationship with his tech-savvy preteen son, Percy, and his rich ex-wife, Inez.

When Carl has the chance to serve prestigious food critic and blogger Ramsey Michel, Riva demands he prepare old favorites at the last minute; Carl concedes, leading to a scathing review. Carl insults Ramsey on Twitter, not realizing that his reply is public, and gains a large online following. Carl comes up with a new menu that his staff loves and invites Ramsey to a "rematch", but leaves after confronting Riva, who wants the old menu again.

At home, Carl prepares the menu he wanted, while his sous-chef Tony serves Ramsey the same dishes from his prior visit. Ramsey tweets negatively about Carl, provoking Carl into confronting him at the restaurant. Videos of Carl's meltdown go viral, leaving him humiliated and unemployable.

Carl reluctantly accepts Inez's invitation to accompany her and Percy to Miami, where he rediscovers his love for Cuban cuisine. At Inez's encouragement, her ex-husband Marvin offers Carl a dilapidated food truck. Carl and Percy bond while restoring the truck and buying groceries, and Carl gives him a chef's knife. Martin, Carl's friend and former line cook, turns down his promotion at Gauloise to join Carl, who has reignited his passion as a chef.

Carl, Martin, and Percy drive the truck across the country to Los Angeles, serving Cuban sandwiches and yuca fries. Percy promotes them on social media, and they find success in New Orleans and Austin, where their daily specials include po' boys, beignets and barbecued brisket, made with local ingredients.

Back in Los Angeles, having strengthened his relationship with Percy, Carl accepts his son's offer to help with the food truck, with Inez also joining them. Ramsey visits the truck to explain his bad review: though an early fan of Carl, he was disappointed by a meal he felt was beneath Carl's skills. Impressed with the chef's return to form, Ramsey offers to bankroll a new restaurant where Carl will have full creative control.

Six months later, the successful new restaurant is closed for a private event: Carl and Inez's remarriage ceremony.

Cast
 Jon Favreau as Carl Casper
 Emjay Anthony as Percy Casper
 John Leguizamo as Martin
 Sofía Vergara as Inez Casper
 Bobby Cannavale as Tony
 Scarlett Johansson as Molly
 Oliver Platt as Ramsey Michel
 Dustin Hoffman as Riva
 Amy Sedaris as Jen
 Robert Downey Jr. as Marvin
 Russell Peters as Miami cop

Musician Gary Clark Jr, Franklin Barbecue owner Aaron Franklin and general manager Benji Jacob cameo as themselves.

Production

Development
Jon Favreau, the writer, director and star of Chef, wrote the film's script in about two weeks. He had long wanted to make a film about food and chefs, and felt that the subject was suited to a small-scale independent film rather than a big-budget production. He cited Jiro Dreams of Sushi, Eat Drink Man Woman and Big Night as inspirations for creating a food-centric film.

The script was semi-autobiographical, incorporating parts of Favreau's life into the main character, such as being a father while having a busy career and coming from a "broken home". Favreau also drew a comparison between his career as a director and Carl's career as a chef; he stepped down from directing major studio films to go "back to basics" and create Chef on a smaller budget, much like Carl's resignation from a popular restaurant to work in a food truck.

Favreau contacted Roy Choi, a restaurateur who created the Kogi Korean BBQ food truck, to serve as a consultant on the film; Choi was eventually promoted to co-producer. While the film was in pre-production, Favreau shadowed Choi in his restaurants and worked as part of Choi's kitchen crew after training at a culinary school. Choi oversaw the menus prepared for the film and created the Cuban sandwiches that form a central part of the storyline.

Casting
In addition to Favreau, the first actors cast in main roles were Sofía Vergara, John Leguizamo and Bobby Cannavale. To prepare for his role as Martin the line cook, Leguizamo spent time working as an actual line cook at The Lion in the West Village. It was announced that Robert Downey, Jr.whom Favreau had previously directed in two Iron Man filmshad joined the cast in May 2013. Scarlett Johansson and Dustin Hoffman were cast later that month. Favreau felt the casting was one of the film's biggest successes, which provided him with "a tremendous amount of confidence"; in particular, he was impressed by Emjay Anthony, who was ten years old at the time of filming.

Filming

Principal photography of the film began in July 2013 in Los Angeles. Subsequent filming took place in Miami, Austin and New Orleans—cities that Favreau chose to work into the story because they all "possess a rich food and music culture". Filming locations in Miami included the Versailles restaurant, the Fontainebleau Hotel, and the Cuban restaurant Hoy Como Ayer in Little Havana. In New Orleans, some scenes were filmed at Café du Monde in the city's French Quarter.

In Austin, filming locations included Franklin Barbecue and Guero's on South Congress. Filming of the shopping scene took place in Los Angeles at Charlie's Fixtures. Food prepared for the shoot was eaten by the cast and crew after filming. Much of the dialogue in the food truck scenes between Favreau, John Leguizamo, and Emjay Anthony was improvised in order to capture the banter of a kitchen environment.

Soundtrack
Milan Records released a Chef soundtrack on May 6, 2014, three days before the film's release. The soundtrack is a combination of Latin jazz, New Orleans jazz and blues, which serve as background to the storyline as it moves through Miami, New Orleans and Austin, respectively. The film's music was chosen by music supervisor Mathieu Schreyer, while additional incidental music was scored by Lyle Workman.

Charts

Release

Chef premiered on March 7, 2014, at South by Southwest, where it was the opening film of the festival and was attended by Favreau, Leguizamo, Anthony, and Platt. It was subsequently screened at the Tribeca Film Festival in April. On August 19, Open Road Films announced to re-release the film nationally on August 29 for a Labor Day weekend, which would grow 100 screens to 600–800.

Box office

The film was released theatrically on May 9, 2014, beginning in limited release in six theaters and expanding throughout May and June to a peak of 1,298 theaters. Its total gross in the United States as of November 2, 2014 is $31.4 million.

Outside of the U.S., Chef performed best in Australia (earning $2.8 million), the United Kingdom and Spain ($2.6 million in each country) and Mexico (earning a little over $1 million). In total, Chef has grossed almost $15 million outside the United States.

Critical response
On review aggregation website Rotten Tomatoes, the film has an approval rating of 87% based on 189 reviews, with an average rating of 6.8/10. The site's critical consensus reads, "Chefs charming cast and sharp, funny script add enough spice to make this feel-good comedy a flavorful—if familiar—treat." Metacritic gave the film a score of 68 out of 100, based on 36 critics, indicating "generally favorable reviews".

Rolling Stones Peter Travers gave the film 3.5 out of 4 stars, describing it as "an artful surprise and an exuberant gift" and "deliciously entertaining, comic, touching and often bitingly true". Ty Burr of the Boston Globe also awarded the film 3.5 out of 4 stars; he thought it was "funny and heartfelt" and that, despite its weaknesses, the strengths "overpower the parts of the meal that are undercooked". Chicago Sun-Times critic Richard Roeper gave Chef 3 out of 4 stars, finding it "funny, quirky and insightful, with a bounty of interesting supporting characters" but also noting the lack of plot and character development in some parts. Gary Goldstein of the Los Angeles Times gave particular praise to the "terrific supporting cast" and the script's lack of cliché, such as in its presentation of family dynamics.

Joe Leydon from Variety found the film's plot predictable and slow-paced, but noted "the trip itself is never less than pleasant, and often extremely funny". The New York Times Stephen Holden described Chef as "aggressively feel-good" and "shallow but enjoyable". Michael O'Sullivan of The Washington Post gave the film 3.5 out of 4 stars and found it "deeply satisfying, down to the soul", praising the "incredible" food photography, the "colorful supporting cast" and the "wryly observant" humor, raving, "There's nothing terribly profound about "Chef". But its messagethat relationships, like cooking, take a hands-on approachis a sweet and sustaining one." San Francisco Chronicle film critic Mick LaSalle opined that Chef was Favreau's best film to date, highlighting the "natural and convincing" chemistry between Favreau and Anthony and the "vivid" scenes featuring big-name actors in small roles.

USA Today Scott Bowles gave Chef 3.5 out of 4 stars and called it "a nuanced side dish, a slow-cooked film that's one of the most heartwarming of the young year". Ken Choy of Wide Lantern noted the structural problems but admitted, "If you ever saw the Kristen Bell sloth video on Ellen, that was me during the entire 2nd half of the movie. Non-stop tears. It was happy-crying because Favreau's character was doing what he wanted."

Slant Magazine critic Chris Cabin, gave Chef a 1.5 out of 4 stars and described it as Favreau's "most self-satisfied, safe, and compromised film to date", chiefly criticizing the film's lack of realism and credibility. Writing for The Village Voice, Amy Nicholson agreed that the storyline was implausible and summarized the film as "so charmingly middlebrow that it's exactly the cinematic comfort food it mocks". Indiewire's Eric Kohn opined that with Chef, "Favreau has no sweeping thematic aims", and that the end product was a "self-indulgent vanity project".

Television series
In 2019, Favreau and Choi released a documentary television spin-off on Netflix, The Chef Show, that sees Jon Favreau and Roy Choi, "experiment with their favorite recipes and techniques, baking, cooking, exploring and collaborating with some bold-face names in the entertainment and culinary world". A second season was released in 2020.

Remake
In 2017, the film was remade into an Indian comedy-drama, also titled Chef, by Raja Krishna Menon, featuring Saif Ali Khan and Padmapriya Janakiraman in the lead roles.

References

External links

 
 
 
 

2014 films
2014 comedy-drama films
2014 independent films
2010s road comedy-drama films
American road comedy-drama films
American independent films
Cooking films
Films about food and drink
Films about chefs
Films about social media
Films about trucks
Films set in Austin, Texas
Films set in Los Angeles
Films set in Miami
Films set in New Orleans
Films set in restaurants
Films shot in Austin, Texas
Films shot in Los Angeles
Films shot in Miami
Films shot in New Orleans
Films directed by Jon Favreau
Films produced by Jon Favreau
Food trucks
Films scored by Lyle Workman
Open Road Films films
2010s English-language films
2010s American films